Jameh Mosque of Pachian is related to the Qajar dynasty And is located in the city of Qom Province, Jafarabad District, in the village of Pachian.

References

Mosques in Iran
Mosque buildings with domes
National works of Iran
Pachian